The Rest Cure is a 1923 British silent comedy film directed by A. E. Coleby and starring George Robey, Sydney Fairbrother and Gladys Hamer.

Cast
 George Robey as George  
 Sydney Fairbrother as Mrs. George 
 Gladys Hamer as The Maid  
 Bertie Wright as The Idiot  
 Harry Preston as The Squire  
 Bob Reed as The Vicar  
 Mickey Brantford as The Boy 
 Joan Whalley as The Girl  
 Minna Leslie as The Friend  
 George Bishop as The Cabman  
 Raymond Ellis as The Landlord

References

Bibliography
 Goble, Alan. The Complete Index to Literary Sources in Film. Walter de Gruyter, 1999.
 Low, Rachael. The History of the British Film 1918-1929. George Allen & Unwin, 1971.

External links
 

1923 films
1923 comedy films
British comedy films
British silent feature films
Films directed by A. E. Coleby
Films based on British novels
British black-and-white films
1920s English-language films
1920s British films
Silent comedy films